Rue de Presbourg is a street in the 8th and 16th arrondissements of Paris. Since 1864 it has been named after Napoleon's 1805 diplomatic success at the Peace of Pressburg and, with the Rue de Tilsitt (named after another such success in 1807), it forms a circle around Place Charles de Gaulle.